A Pocket Full of Rye is a work of detective fiction by Agatha Christie and first published in the UK by the Collins Crime Club on 9 November 1953, and in the US by Dodd, Mead & Co. the following year.  The UK edition retailed at ten shillings and sixpence (10/6) and the US edition at $2.75. The book features her detective Miss Marple. 

Like several of Christie's novels (e.g., Hickory Dickory Dock and One, Two, Buckle My Shoe) the title and substantial parts of the plot reference a nursery rhyme, in this case "Sing a Song of Sixpence". Miss Marple travels to the Fortescue home to offer information on the maid, Gladys Martin. She works with Inspector Neele until the mysteries are revealed.

Two reviewers at the time of publication felt that "the hidden mechanism of the plot is ingenious at the expense of probability" and that the novel was "Not quite so stunning as some of Mrs Christie's criminal assaults upon her readers". Christie's overall high quality in writing detective novels led one to say "they ought to make her a Dame". Writing later, another reviewer felt that the characters included an "exceptionally nasty family of suspects" in what was "Still, a good, sour read."

Plot summary
When London businessman Rex Fortescue dies after drinking his morning tea, Scotland Yard Detective Inspector Neele spearheads the investigation. An autopsy reveals the cause of death was poisoning by taxine, a toxic alkaloid obtained from the yew tree, and that Fortescue ingested it with his breakfast, while a search of his clothing reveals a quantity of rye in his jacket pocket.

Rex's wife Adele is the main suspect in the murder. Son Lancelot and his wife Pat are travelling from Kenya to London, at the invitation of his father, according to Lance; at Paris, he wires that he will be home next day, and police meet him at the airport. The day Lance arrives at Yewtree Lodge, leaving his wife in London, Adele dies of cyanide in her tea, and a few hours later the maid Gladys Martin is found strangled in the yard, with a clothes peg put on her nose.

Inspector Neele is working full-time with the aid of Sergeant Hay on these murders, interviewing all at the office and in the home. The older son, Percival, tells the Inspector that his father was erratic and ruining the business. After the story of the three murders is in the newspapers, Miss Marple arrives at Yewtree Lodge to shed light on Gladys Martin, who learned serving and cleaning at Miss Marple's home. Miss Ramsbottom, Rex's sister-in-law, invites her to stay. Inspector Neele agrees to work with Miss Marple, seeing what she can add. Neele learns that the taxine was ingested in marmalade, with a new jar put out at breakfast used by Rex alone; that jar had been tossed in the yard and found by police. When Miss Marple and Inspector Neele discuss the case, she asks him if he has asked about blackbirds, having seen the pattern of the old children's rhyme "Sing a Song of Sixpence." When he does ask, he learns of dead blackbirds on Rex's desk at home, a pie whose contents were removed and replaced with dead blackbirds, and from Lance, of the Blackbird Mine in east Africa.

The Blackbird Mine was found by a Mr MacKenzie and suspected of containing gold. Rex Fortescue investigated the land after investing capital in it, then left MacKenzie there to die, returning alone and owning the land that he felt was of no value. Mrs MacKenzie had subsequently blamed Rex for her husband's death, promising to teach her children to avenge their father. Both the Inspector and Miss Marple suspect that the daughter is in the household under another name, as the son died in the war. The Inspector suspects Mary Dove, the housekeeper, and tells her so; later, Jennifer Fortescue, wife of Percy, tells Miss Marple that she was the MacKenzies' daughter, and the Inspector confirms it. Jennifer put out the dead blackbirds near Rex to remind him of his past offence; Miss Marple realizes this gave the theme to the murderer. Dove immediately blackmails Jennifer; Inspector Neele says if Dove pays the money back, he will not charge her.

Miss Marple explains to Inspector Neele who killed Rex Fortescue: Gladys, who put the poison in the marmalade believing it was a truth drug, and the rye in his pocket, at the direction of her boyfriend, Albert Evans. The unattractive Gladys was very easy to persuade to assist him, never questioning his motives and flattered by his attentions. Miss Marple explains that Albert Evans is really Lance Fortescue, who wants the deed to the Blackbird Mine, as uranium has been found there. He arranged the murder of his father to stop the loss of cash and to deal only with his brother. He murdered his stepmother because she would inherit a large amount of money, but only if she lived thirty days after her husband, and he killed Gladys so she would not talk, leaving the clothes pin to match the line in the rhyme.

When Miss Marple returns home, a letter from Gladys waylaid in the post awaits her. She explains all she did and begs Miss Marple's help, as she does not know what to do, and encloses a photo of her and her Albert – clearly Lance Fortescue. Inspector Neele's case will be very strong.

Characters
 Miss Marple: trained Gladys in the duties of service in a home or at a restaurant, and feels responsible when she reads of the murders where Gladys works.
 Miss Griffith: head typist at the offices of Rex Fortescue. She calls his doctor.
 Miss Irene Grosvenor: competent, beautiful blonde secretary in the offices of Rex Fortescue, his personal secretary.
 Miss Somers: newest secretary in the office of Rex Fortescue, never able to know when water is boiling for tea.
 Inspector Neele: Detective Inspector of the CID (Criminal Investigation Division) who handles the death of Rex Fortescue and the following two deaths at the Fortescue home. He is quick-thinking, making sure of the cause of death rapidly, so it is known to be murder.
 Professor Bernsdorff: Pathologist at St Jude's hospital who discerns the cause of death for Rex.
 Sergeant Hay: assists Inspector Neele. He finds the discarded jar of marmalade in the yard.
 Rex Fortescue: Wealthy, unscrupulous businessman in London who dies at his office. He is over 60 years old, and suspected by his sons of a serious disease which impairs his functions in the business, Consolidated Investments.
 Percival Fortescue: eldest son of Rex, working with him in the business. He is more conservative in his investments than his father is. He is called either Percy or Val and is about 30 years old. He seems to get what he wants, and has the most to gain from the deaths of his father and stepmother, but could not have killed the latter.
 Jennifer Fortescue: wife of Percival for the last three years. They met when she nursed him back to health from pneumonia. She is bored by her life as a wife, without the focus of professional nursing. She was Ruby MacKenzie before she married.
 Lancelot Fortescue: Rex's second son, nicknamed Lance. The two argued eleven years earlier, causing a breach, but he retains a role in Consolidated Investments as a junior partner. He lives in Kenya, coming home apparently to reconcile with his father because he is very happy with Pat, and wants to settle down. He is handsome, attractive, clever and completely unscrupulous.
 Pat Fortescue: Lance's wife, recently married. They met in Kenya, where she went to start life afresh after losing two husbands, first one to the war, second one to suicide (Lord Frederick Anstice). She loves Lance and he loves her. She is unaware of Lance's crimes, believing the stories he tells of his father sending for him. Miss Marple advises her to return to her childhood home, if troubles should find her in her life again.
 Elaine Fortescue: Rex's daughter, and youngest child, in her twenties. She is in love and wants to marry, but her father forbids the marriage. Once he dies, she tells her brother she will marry in a month, and start a school with her husband. She is the only person to shed a tear for her father's death.
 Gerald Wright: schoolmaster loved by Elaine. He comes to the area when Elaine calls him after her father dies.
 Miss Ramsbottom: Aunt Effie, older sister of Rex's first wife Elvira, the mother of their children. She has stern views regarding moral behaviour, yet does not call out Lance's lie as to the time he was with her on the day of his arrival. She spends time with visiting missionaries, and is over 70 years old.
 Adele Fortescue: Rex's second wife, about thirty years younger than he is, about the age of his sons. They have been married two years. She is a beautiful woman who loves expensive things, described by Mary Dove as "a sexy piece".
 Vivien Edward Dubois: golf and tennis partner, and lover of Mrs Fortescue. He is the sole heir in her will.
 Mary Dove: housekeeper of Yewtree Lodge. She is competent and calm in the face of murder.
 Mrs Crump: cook at the Fortescue household, who takes umbrage at the Inspector's suggestion that food she prepared would poison anyone.
 Mr Crump: serves as butler, not very well, but he is a package deal with Mrs Crump.
 Gladys Martin: parlour maid at Yewtree Lodge, the family mansion of the Fortescue family, for about two months.
 Albert Evans: Gladys's boyfriend, whom she discusses with Mrs Crump. He is a false identity used by Lance Fortescue.
 Ellen Curtis: housemaid at Yewtree Lodge for several years. 
 Mrs MacKenzie: Mr MacKenzie's widow, who found a potential gold mining field in East Africa and sought capital from Rex, twenty years before the story opens. Rex left him there to die. Rex still owns the land, and claimed that it was worthless, as to gold. She is living in Pinewood private sanatorium. She no longer speaks with her daughter as she only argues with her daughter.
 Donald and Ruby MacKenzie: the MacKenzies' two children, aged 9 and 7 when their father died. Their mother raised them to avenge their father's death. Donald was killed early in the Second World War.

Literary significance and reception
Philip John Stead in The Times Literary Supplement, 4 December 1953 wrote that "Miss Christie's novel belongs to the comfortable branch of detective fiction; it never harrows its readers by realistic presentation of violence or emotion or by making exorbitant demands on their interest in the characters. Crime is a convention, pursuit an intellectual exercise, and it is as if the murderer of the odious financier did but poison in jest. The characters are lightly and deftly sketched and an antiseptic breeze of humour prevails. It is a pleasure to read an author so nicely conscious of the limitations of what she is attempting."  He concluded, "Miss Christie has a reputation for playing fair with the reader who likes to assume detective responsibility, and also for being one too many for him. In the present case it may be felt that the hidden mechanism of the plot is ingenious at the expense of probability, but the tale is told with such confidence that (like murder itself, in this pastoral atmosphere) it does not matter very much."

Maurice Richardson in The Observer (15 November 1953) posited, "Not quite so stunning as some of Mrs Christie's criminal assaults upon her readers; the soufflé rises all right, but the red herrings aren't quite nifty enough. But how well she nearly always writes, the dear decadent old death-trafficker; they ought to make her a Dame or a D. Litt."

Robert Barnard said of the characters that "Super-stockbrokerbelt setting, and quite exceptionally nasty family of suspects. (Christie usually prefers to keep most of her characters at least potentially sympathetic as well as potential murderers, but here they are only the latter)." He felt that the plot was "Something of a re-run of Hercule Poirot's Christmas (loathsome father, goody-goody son, ne'er-do-well son, gold-digger wife, etc.), but without its tight construction and ingenuity. And the rhyme is an irrelevancy." His bottom line on this novel was that  "Still, a good, sour read."

The poison

The aril, the fleshy part of the berry, is the only part of the yew that is non-toxic. The seeds inside the berry contain a high concentration of taxine and are poisonous if chewed. Pets that chew on yew branches or leaves have become ill. One of the characters in the novel remarks that taxine has "no medical uses," which was correct at the time. In 1963, Taxol, which is a member of the taxine family, was found to be one of the most potent and effective chemotherapy drugs for the treatment of solid tumours.

Film, TV, radio or theatrical adaptations

A Pocked Full of Rye was the fourth transmitted story in the BBC series of Miss Marple adaptations, which starred Joan Hickson as the elderly sleuth. It was first broadcast in two parts on 7 & 8 March 1985. Despite remaining faithful to the novel, apart from giving the title as "A Pocketful of Rye", the characters of Mrs MacKenzie, Gerald Wright and Elaine Fortescue did not make an appearance. In the end, the murderer dies in a car crash, while there is no such thing in the novel.

Michael Bakewell's 90-minute adaptation for BBC radio was first broadcast in 1995; it starred June Whitfield as Miss Marple. 

The novel was adapted for the fourth series of the British television series Agatha Christie's Marple broadcast on ITV on 6 September 2009, starring Julia McKenzie as the title character. In comparison with the other episodes, this adaptation was surprisingly faithful, having only minor changes.

Publication history
 1953, Collins Crime Club (London), 9 November, hardcover, 192 pp.
 1954, Dodd Mead and Company (New York), hardcover, 211 pp.
 1955, Pocket Books (New York), paperback, 186 pp.
 1958, Fontana Books (Imprint of HarperCollins), paperback, 191 pp.
 1964, Ulverscroft Large-print ed., hardcover, 191 pp.
 1981, Greenway ed. of collected works (William Collins), hardcover, .
 2006, Marple facsimile ed. (of 1953 UK 1st ed.), 3 January 2006, hardcover, .

The novel was first serialised, heavily abridged, in the UK in the Daily Express starting on Monday 28 September, running for fourteen instalments until Tuesday 13 October 1953.

The novel was first serialised in the US in the Chicago Tribune in forty-two parts from Monday, 11 January to Saturday, 27 February 1954.

References

External links
A Pocket Full of Rye at the official Agatha Christie website

Miss Marple novels
1953 British novels
Novels first published in serial form
Works originally published in the Daily Express
Collins Crime Club books
British novels adapted into television shows
British novels adapted into films